Vargaresa is a compilation album containing Vargaresa and Ur Nattvindar, two earlier demo albums by the Viking metal band Månegarm. It was released in 2004.

Track listing

External links
 Månegarm's official website

Månegarm albums
2004 compilation albums